Isozoanthus is a genus of anemone-like anthozoans in the order Zoantharia.

Species
Species in this genus include:
 Isozoanthus africanus Carlgren, 1923
 Isozoanthus altisulcatus Carlgren, 1939
 Isozoanthus arborescens (Danielssen, 1890)
 Isozoanthus arenosus Carlgren, 1923
 Isozoanthus bulbosus Carlgren, 1913
 Isozoanthus capensis Carlgren, 1938
 Isozoanthus davisi Carlgren, 1913
 Isozoanthus dubius Carlgren, 1913
 Isozoanthus giganteus Carlgren in Chun, 1903
 Isozoanthus gilchristi Carlgren, 1938
 Isozoanthus ingolfi Carlgren, 1913
 Isozoanthus islandicus Carlgren, 1913
 Isozoanthus magninsulosus Carlgren, 1913
 Isozoanthus multinsulosus Carlgren, 1913
 Isozoanthus sulcatus (Gosse, 1859)
 Isozoanthus valdivae Carlgren, 1923

References

 
Parazoanthidae
Hexacorallia genera
Taxa named by Oskar Carlgren